Émile Leon Cammaerts CBE (16 March 1878 in Saint-Gilles, Belgium – 2 November 1953, Radlett, Hertfordshire) was a Belgian playwright, poet (including war poet) and author who wrote primarily in English and French.

Cammaerts translated three books by art, history and landscape expert John Ruskin  and selected G. K. Chesterton Father Brown detective stories in La clairvoyance du père Brown.

He became Professor of Belgian Studies at the University of London in 1933, most of his works and papers are held there in the Senate House Library.

Cammaerts is the author of a famous quotation (often mistakenly attributed to G. K. Chesterton) in his study on Chesterton:

Personal life 
Cammaerts was born in Saint-Gilles, a suburb of Brussels. He was educated at the University of Brussels and later at the experimental Université Nouvelle where he studied geography. He migrated to England in 1908 and was baptised as an Anglican at age 34 (c. 1912) henceforth taking the middle name Pieter. 

He married the Shakespearian actress Helen Tita Braun, known as Tita Brand (daughter of opera singer Marie Brema), with whom he had six children, including Pieter Cammaerts, who was killed while serving in the Royal Air Force during World War II, prominent SOE operative Francis Cammaerts and Catherine Noel "Kippe" Cammaerts, an actress and mother of Michael Morpurgo.

Works

Poems
 Belgian Poems : Chants patriotique, et autres poèmes (1915)
 New Belgian Poems. Les trois rois et autres poèmes (1916 – 3 editions)
 Messines and other Poems (1918)

Stage productions
A Christmas virgil at The New Theatre, St Martins Lane (1910) Tita played the widow
 Carillon, stage recitation, music by Edward Elgar:   (1914)
 Une voix dans le désert, stage recitation in English and French versions with music by Edward Elgar (1915) containing the poem for soprano aria below
 Quand nos bourgeons se rouvriront and for the English version When the spring comes round from Une voix dans le désert
 Le drapeau belge, recitation, with music by Edward Elgar (1917)

Books
 The Adoration of Soldiers (1916) with illustrated poems 
 La Veillée de Noël. Les deux bossus (1917) 
 Through the iron bars, two years of German occupation in Belgium (1917)
 A ma patrie enchainée (1918) 
 A history of Belgium from the Roman invasion to the present day (1921/2) 
 The legend of Ulenspiegel (1922)
 The Treasure of Belgium (1924)
 The Poetry of Nonsense (1925)
 Discoveries in England (1930)
 Albert of Belgium, defender of right, a biography of King Albert I of Belgium (1935)
 The Laughing Prophet: The Seven Virtues And G. K. Chesterton (Study of G. K. Chesterton – 1937)
 The Keystone of Europe (1939)
 The Prisoner at Laeken: King Leopold, Legend and Fact (1941)
 The Situation of Belgium: September 1939 to January 1941 (1941)
 Upon this rock (1943)
 The flower of grass (1944/5) 
 The peace that is left (1945)
 Principalities and Powers with Jeanne Lindley (1947)
 The Devil takes the Chair (1949) 
 The cloud and the silver lining (1952) (followed by Christian contributions to the BBC Silver Lining Radio programme series
 The Work of our Hands (1953) book on the themes of art and religion

Other
 Translation of Guido Gezelle from the West Flemish dialect with Charles Van der Borren, Poèmes choisis 
 Preface to The glory of Belgium – An anthology (1915) collated and edited by Russell Markland and dedicated on the front opening to Cammaerts.
 Baron Edmond de Cartier de Marchienne (1946) booklet
 Article on William Dobson, painter An English successor to van Dyck: William Dobson'' Second series no III

Notes

References

External links 

Catalogue of Émile Cammaerts' papers
 
 
Famous Belgians Website – Émile Leon Cammaerts
"Carillon": monologue with music, poem by Émile Cammaerts and music by Elgar Score from Sibley Music Library Digital Scores Collection
"Une voix dans le désert": monologue with music, poem by Émile Cammaerts and music by Elgar Score from Sibley Music Library Digital Scores Collection

1878 births
1953 deaths
Writers from Brussels
Belgian poets in French
People from Radlett